Jay Mills is anAmerican  former college football coach and pastor. He is the executive pastor at Pleasant Valley Community Church in Owensboro, Kentucky. Mills served as the head football coach at University of Minnesota Morris from 1993 to 1995 and at Charleston Southern University from 2003 to 2012, compiling a career college football coaching record of 51–85.

Playing career
Mills played football at the Western Washington University before graduating in 1984.

Coaching career
Jay Mills is from a family of coaches, he spent thirty years coaching college football (thirteen of which has a head coach). Coach Mills served at premier institutions like Notre Dame and Harvard and was mentored by some of the greatest coaches of our generation, such as Lou Holtz.
Jay has taught a university course on coaching motivation, received the Mike Campbell Lifetime Achievement award for his coaching career, and even had the pleasure of coaching a Heisman winner. 

He first served as the head football coach for the University of Minnesota Morris from 1993 to 1995 and at Charleston Southern University from 2003 to 2012, compiling a career college football record of 51–85. Mills retired from coaching on January 3, 2013, to pursue a new career path in athletic administration. 

Before arriving at Charleston Southern University, Mills was offensive coordinator for seven seasons at Harvard University.  He served as head coach at the University of Minnesota Morris, where he posted a 3–22 record as he helped the school transition from the National Association of Intercollegiate Athletics (NAIA) to NCAA Division II.

Head coaching record

Notes

References

1961 births
Living people
Boise State Broncos football coaches
Charleston Southern Buccaneers football coaches
Harvard Crimson football coaches
Minnesota Morris Cougars football coaches
Notre Dame Fighting Irish football coaches
Western Washington Vikings football players